Events in the year 1927 in Belgium.

Incumbents
Monarch – Albert I
Prime Minister – Henri Jaspar

Events
 22 January – Funeral of Charlotte of Belgium (former Empress of Mexico) in Laken (Brussels).
 10 February – League against Imperialism founded at a Congress of Oppressed Peoples in the Egmont Palace, Brussels
 1 March – Committee for Public Works established.
 15 September – Belgium loses its seat on the permanent council of the League of Nations.
 October – Fifth International Solvay Conference
 21 November – Government falls after Socialists question policy on military service.

Publications
 Hendrik de Man, Au-delà du marxisme / Zur Psychologie des Sozialismus
 Willem Elsschot, Lijmen
 Stijn Streuvels, De teleurgang van de Waterhoek

Art and architecture

Buildings
 Le Corbusier, Maison Guiette, Antwerp

Paintings
 René Magritte, The Enchanted Pose; The Meaning of Night; The Menaced Assassin

Births
 26 January – Victor Mees, footballer (died 2012)
 30 January – Jef Nys, comics writer (died 2009)
 28 February – Joseph Noiret, artist (died 2012)
 9 March — Will Ferdy, singer (died 2022)
 1 May – Roland Verhavert, film-maker (died 2014)
 7 May – Luc de Heusch, anthropologist (died 2012)
 7 July – Henri Dirickx, international footballer (died 2018)
 8 July – Willy De Clercq, politician (died 2011)
 1 August – André Cools, politician (died 1991)
 11 September – Luc Versteylen, Jesuit (died 2021)
 11 October – Joséphine-Charlotte of Belgium, grand duchess of Luxembourg (died 2005)

Deaths
 19 January – Charlotte of Belgium (born 1840)
 6 March – Joseph Bascourt (born 1863), architect 
 4 April
 Albert Van Coile (born 1900), footballer
 Auguste Goffinet (born 1857), courtier
 17 May – Emilius Seghers (born 1855), bishop of Ghent
 28 May – Théophile Lybaert (born 1848), artist
 29 May – Georges Eekhoud (born 1854), novelist
 11 July – Fernand Feyaerts (born 1880), Olympic swimmer
 30 August – Émile Braun (born 1849), engineer
 28 October – Oscar Van Den Bossche (born 1893), rower
 2 November – Rodolphe Wytsman (died 1860), painter

References

 
1920s in Belgium
Belgium
Years of the 20th century in Belgium
Belgium